What You Want is a single by Palestinian-Canadian rapper Belly, featuring vocals from Canadian singer the Weeknd. It was released on May 24, 2018, for streaming and digital download by Roc Nation and XO. The song was produced by the ANMLS and fellow rapper and fellow XO labelmate Nav, and co-produced by Cirkut.

Background 
"What You Want" is a single off the Immigrant album. It features guest vocals from fellow XO labelmate the Weeknd. This would be their second collaboration, following Belly's 2015 single, "Might Not". The song was officially released on May 24, 2018. Belly told Billboard in an interview, "It was the most fun I ever had shooting a video, me and Abel always have amazing chemistry when we work, but this one takes the cake." The music video was released on May 30, 2018. As of June 2019, the video has clocked in over 10 million views.

Music video
The music video was released on May 30, 2018. As of August 2019, the music video has received over 10 million views on YouTube.

Charts

Certifications

Release history

References

External links
 
 

2018 singles
2018 songs
Belly (rapper) songs
The Weeknd songs
Songs written by Belly (rapper)
Songs written by the Weeknd
Songs written by Nav (rapper)
Song recordings produced by Cirkut (record producer)